Paul Schwartz (born 1959) is an expert in information privacy law. He is the Jefferson E. Peyser Professor at the UC Berkeley School of Law and a director of the Berkeley Center for Law and Technology. He is the former Anita and Stuart Subotnick Professor of Law at Brooklyn Law School, from 1998 to 2004.

Schwartz has written many books, including the leading casebook Information Privacy Law, and the distilled guide Privacy Law Fundamentals, each with Daniel Solove. Over 50 of his articles have appeared in journals such as the Harvard Law Review, Yale Law Journal, Stanford Law Review, and Chicago Law Review. Fluent in German, he also contributes to German legal reviews.

Schwartz is the recipient of various awards and fellowships from different foundations, including the American Academy in Berlin, the German Marshall Fund in Brussels, Alexander von Humboldt Foundation, and Fulbright Foundation.

Schwartz has been quoted by media outlets including Forbes, the New York Times, the Washington Post, the Wall Street Journal.

Research and teaching 

Schwartz's research centers around the legal and policy implications of data mining, security breaches, and spyware. Together with Daniel J. Solove, Schwartz has re-introduced and systematized the concept of personally identifiable information in privacy law. A special focus of his work has been comparative law and differences in the privacy law of the European Union and the United States. He teaches information privacy, intellectual property, and tort law.

Academic career
Paul Schwartz graduated from Brown University and Yale Law School, where he served as a senior editor of the Yale Law Journal. He was the Anita and Stuart Subotnick Professor of Law at Brooklyn Law School from 1998 to 2004.  He joined the Berkeley Law faculty in 2006. He is co-reporter of the American Law Institute’s Restatement of Privacy Law Principles. He is a member of the organizing committee of the Privacy and Security Forum and the Privacy Law Salon. He is co-reporter of the American Law Institute's Restatement of Information Privacy Principles.

Popular appeal
Many law professors have sought to promote the critical thinking of students in tort awareness throughout their lives and studies. However, despite the importance of the study of torts, students only study torts as a first-year doctrinal class. In a response to this and in an attempt to promote his students' attention to torts, Schwartz created the phrase "You Only Tort Once," or "YOTO."

Selected publications

Books
 Paul M. Schwartz, & Daniel J. Solove, Privacy Law Fundamentals, IAPP, 2015
 Paul M. Schwartz, & Daniel J. Solove, Information Privacy Law, Aspen Publishers, 5th ed. 2015
 Paul M. Schwartz, & Daniel J. Solove, Privacy, Information, and Technology, Aspen Publishers, 3d ed. 2011
 Paul M. Schwartz, & Daniel J. Solove, Privacy and the Media, Aspen Publishers, 2009
 Joel R. Reidenberg, & Paul M. Schwartz, On-line Services and Data Protection and Privacy: Regulatory Responses, Brussels, 1998
 Joel R. Reidenberg, & Paul M. Schwartz, Data Privacy Law, Michie Publishing, 1996

Articles

 Paul M. Schwartz, & Daniel J. Solove, The PII Problem: Privacy and a New Concept of Personally Identifiable Information, 86 N.Y.U. Law Review 1814 (2011)
 Karl-Nikolaus Peifer, & Paul M. Schwartz, Prosser’s Privacy and the German Right of Personality: Are Four Privacy Torts Better than One Unitary Concept?, 98 California Law Review 1925 (2010)
 Paul M. Schwartz, Preemption and Privacy, 118 Yale Law Journal 902 (2009)
 Paul M. Schwartz, Property, Privacy, and Personal Data, 117 Harvard Law Review 2055 (2004)
 Paul M. Schwartz, Voting Technology and Democracy, 75 N.Y.U. Law Review 625 (2002)

References 

1959 births
Living people
UC Berkeley School of Law faculty
Scholars of privacy law
Brown University alumni
Yale Law School alumni
Brooklyn Law School faculty